"Beautiful Life" is a song written by Felix de Laet, Janne Kask and Sandro Cavazza. It features vocals of singer Sandro Cavazza. The song topped the charts in Belgium and charted on a number of European singles charts.

Track listing

Charts and certifications

Weekly charts

Year-end charts

Certifications

References 

2016 singles
Lost Frequencies songs
Sandro Cavazza songs
2016 songs
Songs written by Sandro Cavazza
Songs written by Lost Frequencies